Major General Md. Ismail Faruque Chowdhury (born 25 July 1953) is a former engineer-in-chief of the Bangladesh Army.

Early life and education

Chowdhury was born on 25 July 1953 in the Maulvibazar District of Sylhet Division of Bangladesh. He passed his HSC examination from Dhaka College in the year 1970. During service in the army, he completed his bachelor's and master's degrees in Civil Engineering from Bangladesh University of Engineering and Technology in Dhaka.

Career
Chowdhury was commissioned in the Corps of Engineers of the Bangladesh Army on 25 December 1977 after completing his training at the Bangladesh Military Academy.  He served in the UN Peacekeeping Force UNTAET in East Timor as Commander of the Bangladesh Engineer Battalion from March 2000 to March 2001. He commanded an Independent Engineer Brigade in Dhaka. He was the 4th Commandant of the Military Institute of Science and Technology in Mirpur Cantonment, Dhaka, Bangladesh. In February 2006, he was appointed as Engineer-in-Chief (E-in-C) of the Bangladesh Army. As E-in-C, he was also the head of the Military Engineer Services of the Bangladesh Armed Forces. Maj Gen Ismail Faruque was a participant of the Senior International Defence Management Course (SIDMC)-2006 at the Defense Resource Management Institute (DRMI), Naval Postgraduate School (NPS), Monterey, California. After attaining 55 years of age he qualified for obtaining normal retirement from military service and proceeded on Leave Preparatory to Retirement (LPR) on 24 July 2008. Thereafter in June 2009 he joined on contract service with Mirpur Ceramic Works Ltd and Khadim Ceramics Ltd as executive director.

References

Living people
1951 births
Dhaka College alumni
Bangladesh University of Engineering and Technology alumni
Bangladesh Army generals
People from Moulvibazar District

Engineers in Chief of the Bangladesh Army